The Caspar C 23 was a German two-seat biplane sports aircraft that flew in 1925.

Design and development
One C.23 was built, which received the civil registration D-648. It took part in the 1925 Deutschen Rundflug.

Specifications

References

Citations

Bibliography

C023
Biplanes
Single-engined tractor aircraft
Aircraft first flown in 1925